Tachina barbata is a species of fly in the genus Tachina of the family Tachinidae that is endemic to Russia.

References

Insects described in 1984
Endemic fauna of Russia
barbata